Gustaf Otto Brunkman (2 September 1888 – 26 November 1959) was a Swedish rower. He competed at the 1912 Summer Olympics alongside his elder brother Conrad, but was eliminated in the quarterfinals of the men's eight tournament.

References

1888 births
1959 deaths
Swedish male rowers
Olympic rowers of Sweden
Rowers at the 1912 Summer Olympics
People from Karlskrona
Sportspeople from Blekinge County